Ivan Maček, nom de guerre Matija (28 May 1908 – 10 July 1993), was a Yugoslav Communist politician from Slovenia who served as the President of the People's Assembly of SR Slovenia from 1963 to 1967.

Biography 
Maček was born in Spodnja Zadobrova near Ljubljana, Austria-Hungary (now in Slovenia).  He became a member of the Communist Party of Yugoslavia in 1930, and in 1935 was sent to the Soviet Union where he studied at the International Lenin School, Moscow. He returned to Yugoslavia in 1937 and became a member of the Central committee of the newly found Communist party of Slovenia. Yugoslav police detained him in 1938 and he was sentenced to four years in prison in Sremska Mitrovica.

After the invasion of Yugoslavia in 1941, he and a group of 32 other communist political prisoners escaped from the prison and joined the Yugoslav partisan resistance. In 1942 he was sent to occupied Slovenia to be one of commanders of the Slovene partisan resistance. There he was appointed commander of the Main Headquarters of the Partisan Units of Slovenia and political commissar of the Main headquarters during 1942. Maček was appointed the rank of general-major and became a member of the Liberation Front of the Slovene Nation in 1944.

After the war, Maček moved into a mansion that had been confiscated from the pharmacist Leo Bahovec. Maček was minister of the interior and vice-president of the Slovene government (1945–1953), vice-president of the Executive council of PR Slovenia and a member of the Federal Executive Council (1953–1963) and also the President of the People's Assembly of SR Slovenia (1963–1967). He was also a deputy in the National and Federal Assembly.

He died in Ljubljana, Slovenia on 10 July 1993 due to heart failure.

Maček was declared a People's Hero of Yugoslavia in 1952.

Post-war extrajudicial killings
According to historian Jože Dežman, chairman of the Commission on Concealed Mass Graves in Slovenia, Ivan Maček is among the most responsible for the post-war extrajudicial killings in Slovenia.

Family 
His cousin was Pepca Kardelj, spouse of the prominent Slovene politician Edvard Kardelj.

References 

1908 births
1993 deaths
People from the City Municipality of Ljubljana
Central Committee of the League of Communists of Yugoslavia members
League of Communists of Slovenia politicians
Yugoslav Partisans members
Recipients of the Order of the People's Hero
Recipients of the Order of the Hero of Socialist Labour